The Czech Socialist Republic (ČSR) was a republic within the Czechoslovak Socialist Republic. The name was used from 1 January 1969 to November 1989, when the previously unitary Czechoslovak state changed into a federation. From 1990 to 1992, the Czech Republic (ČR) existed as a federal subject within the Czech and Slovak Federative Republic, which later became the independent Czech Republic.

History

Czechoslovak Socialist Republic (1969–89)
After the occupation of Czechoslovakia in 1968, liberalisation reforms were stopped and reverted. The only exception was the federalization of the country. The former centralist state Czechoslovakia was divided in two parts: the Czech Socialist Republic and the Slovak Socialist Republic by the Constitutional Law of Federation of 28 October 1968, which went into effect on 1 January 1969. New national parliaments (the Czech National Council and the Slovak National Council) were created and the traditional parliament of Czechoslovakia was renamed the "Federal Assembly" and was divided in two chambers: the House of the People and the House of Nations. Very complicated rules of voting were put in effect.

Czech and Slovak Federative Republic (1990–92)
After the Velvet Revolution which brought the end of socialism in Czechoslovakia, the word socialist was dropped from the names of the two republics. Thus, the Czech Socialist Republic was renamed the Czech Republic (though it was still a part of Czech and Slovak Federative Republic).

The complicated system of parliamentary voting (there were de facto five different bodies each having right of veto) was kept after the fall of socialism, complicating and delaying political decisions during radical changes in the economy.

Later, in 1992, the Czech Republic became an Independent State (see Dissolution of Czechoslovakia).

See also
 Constitutional Law of Federation
 History of Czechoslovakia
 Slovak Socialist Republic (1969–1990)/Slovak Republic (1990–1992)
 Czech and Slovak Federative Republic
 Reconcilee

External links
Constitutional Law of Federation (in Czech)

Communism in the Czech Republic
Czechoslovak Socialist Republic
Former socialist republics
States and territories disestablished in 1993